Egypt competed at the 1980 Summer Paralympics in Arnhem, Netherlands.

Medals 
33 competitors from Egypt won 14 medals including 4 gold, 7 silver and 3 bronze and finished 22nd in the medal table.

Team 
The team included Strange Khater, Hanan Ahmed Fathi, vegetables Metwally, Salem Zubayna, Mohammad Ahmed Salama, Najat Jaber Al-Ali, and Tamer Labib.

Background 
Egypt lacked a national disability sports federation for these Games.  One would not be established until after these Games, ahead of the 1984 Games.

See also 
 Egypt at the Paralympics

References 

Egypt at the Paralympics
Nations at the 1980 Summer Paralympics